The common bile duct, sometimes abbreviated as CBD, is a duct in the gastrointestinal tract of organisms that have a gallbladder. It is formed by the confluence of the common hepatic duct and cystic duct and terminates by uniting with pancreatic duct, forming the ampulla of Vater. The flow of bile from the ampulla of Vater into the duodenum is under the control of the sphincter of Oddi.

When the sphincter of Oddi is closed, newly synthesized bile from the liver is forced into storage in the gallbladder. When open, the stored and concentrated bile (now mixed with pancreatic secretions) exits into the duodenum and takes part in digestion. This conduction of bile is the main function of the common bile duct. The hormone cholecystokinin, when stimulated by a fatty meal, promotes bile secretion by increased production of hepatic bile, contraction of the gallbladder, and relaxation of the sphincter of Oddi.

Clinical significance
Several problems can arise within the common bile duct, usually related to its obstruction. Opinions vary slightly on the maximum calibre of a normal CBD, but 6mm is one accepted upper limit of normal  with a further 1mm diameter allowed for each decade over 60 years.

It normally gets slightly dilated after cholecystectomy, with upper limit (95% prediction interval) being about 10 mm after a few months.

On abdominal ultrasonography, the common bile duct is most readily seen in the porta hepatis (where the CBD lies anterior to the portal vein and hepatic artery). The absence of Doppler signal distinguishes it from the portal vein and hepatic artery.

If obstructed by a gallstone, a condition called choledocholithiasis can result. In this obstructed state, the duct is especially vulnerable to an infection called ascending cholangitis. One form of treatment is a cholecystenterostomy. Rare deformities of the common bile duct are cystic dilations (4 cm), choledochoceles (cystic dilation of the ampula of Vater (3–8 cm)), and biliary atresia.

History
Obstruction of the common bile duct and related jaundice has been documented since at least since the time of Erasistratus.

Additional images

See also 
 Choledochoduodenostomy - a surgical procedure to create a connection between the common bile duct (CBD) and an alternative portion of the duodenum.

References

External links
  - "The gallbladder and extrahepatic bile ducts."
 
 
 

Digestive system
Hepatology
Gallbladder